Dwarf, dwarfs or dwarves may refer to:

Common uses
Dwarf (folklore), a being from Germanic mythology and folklore 
 Dwarf, a person or animal with dwarfism

Arts, entertainment, and media

Fictional entities
Dwarf (Dungeons & Dragons), a short humanoid race
Dwarf (Middle-earth), a humanoid race in J. R. R. Tolkien's literature
Dwarf (Warhammer), a humanoid race
Dwarfs (Discworld), a race of characters
Dwarves (Warcraft), a short, strong race
Dwarves (Marvel Comics)

Literature
The Dwarf (Cho novel), a 1978 novel by Cho Se-hui
The Dwarf (Lagerkvist novel), a 1944 novel by Pär Lagerkvist

Other arts, entertainment, and media
Dwarfs?! (video game)
Dwarves (band), American punk band
Killer Dwarfs, Canadian heavy metal band
Wrocław's dwarfs, small sculptures in Wrocław, Poland

Biology
Phyletic dwarfism, an average decrease in size of animals
Insular dwarfism, a evolutionary condition caused by genetic and environmental factors (e.g. no / little predators and smaller geography)

Cosmology
Dwarf galaxy, in cosmology
Dwarf planet, in cosmology

Other uses
Dwarf, Kentucky
DWARF, a debugging data format
PYGMIES + DWARFS arguments

See also
Dwarf star (disambiguation)
Dwarven language (disambiguation)
 (including many cross-references from common names of plants or animals)